The following articles contain lists of Olympic medalists in handball:

 List of Olympic medalists in handball (men)
 List of Olympic medalists in handball (women)